Schooley may refer to:

People
Bob Schooley, a television producer
Derek Schooley, a hockey player
Roy Schooley, a hockey referee

Places
Schooley, Ohio, a community in the United States
Schooley's Mountain, a mountain ridge in New Jersey
Schooley's Mountain, New Jersey, a community in New Jersey
Schooley's Mountain Historic District, listed on the NRHP in Morris County, New Jersey

See also
Schoolies (disambiguation)
School (disambiguation)